Protein sidekick-2 is a protein that in humans is encoded by the SDK2 gene.

Function
The protein encoded by this gene is a member of the immunoglobulin superfamily. The protein contains two immunoglobulin domains and thirteen fibronectin type III domains. Fibronectin type III domains are present in both extracellular and intracellular proteins and tandem repeats are known to contain binding sites for DNA, heparin and the cell surface. This protein, and a homologous mouse sequence, are very similar to the Drosophila sidekick gene product but the specific function of this superfamily member is not yet known. Evidence for alternative splicing at this gene locus has been observed but the full-length nature of additional variants has not yet been determined.

References

Further reading